Neptis morosa, the savanna sailer or morose sailer, is a butterfly in the family Nymphalidae. It is found in Senegal, Guinea, Sierra Leone, Ivory Coast, Ghana, Togo, Benin, Nigeria, Cameroon, Gabon, the Republic of the Congo, the Central African Republic, Angola, the eastern part of the Democratic Republic of the Congo, Uganda, Burundi, western Kenya and north-western Tanzania. The habitat consists of moist areas and forest margins.

Adult males imbibe dew from the stems of tall grasses.

References

Butterflies described in 1955
morosa